Paseo Interlomas is a  shopping mall in the Interlomas edge city in Huixquilucan, Greater Mexico City. Three department stores anchor the mall: Liverpool, El Palacio de Hierro and Sears.  The landmark Liverpool Interlomas building also houses a 16-screen Cinepolis cinema, an ice rink, 12 restaurants and a food court with 180 vendors.

References

Shopping malls in Greater Mexico City
Shopping malls established in 2011